Turnberry railway station was a railway station serving the Turnberry Golf Course and its associated hotel, South Ayrshire, Scotland. The station was part of the Maidens and Dunure Light Railway.

History
The station opened on 17 May 1906, and closed on 2 March 1942. The platform roof was sold to Dumbarton F.C. in 1957 and used as a terrace cover at the football club's former ground at Boghead Park. Its significance as a railway station can still be linked to the Turnberry Hotel and club house which displays an original railway poster by Claude Buckle showing the Turnberry Hotel in 1932.

References

Notes

Sources
 
 
 
 Article in British Railway Journal No 8 Summer 1985 Wild Swan Publications

Disused railway stations in South Ayrshire
Railway stations in Great Britain closed in 1942
Railway stations in Great Britain opened in 1906
Former Glasgow and South Western Railway stations
James Miller railway stations